Vladimir Andreyevich Favorsky (March 14, 1886 – December 29, 1964) was a Soviet graphic artist, woodcut illustrator, painter, art critic, muralist, and teacher. He was a People's Artist of the USSR from 1963 and a full member of Soviet Academy of Arts from 1962, as well as of the  society.

Background

Favorsky was born on March 14, 1886, in Moscow, Russian Empire. His father, Andrei Evgrafovich Favorsky (1843–1926) was a prominent lawyer and member of the Imperial Russian Duma (Parliament). Favorsky's mother, Olga Vladimirovna Sherwood, was of English-descent, being the daughter of architect Vladimir Osipovich Sherwood, and sister of Vladimir Vladimirovich Sherwood and Leonid Sherwood. The chemist Alexey Favorsky was his uncle.

He taught at the Moscow School of Painting, Sculpture and Architecture; one of his notable students was Sattar Bahlulzade.

Favorsky died on December 29, 1964, and is buried at the Novodevichy Cemetery.

See also
 List of Russian artists

References

Further reading
V. Favorsky, [Collection, Moscow, 1967]

External links
 Vladimir Favorsky Covers and Illustrations
 

1886 births
1964 deaths
20th-century engravers
Russian illustrators
Russian engravers
Burials at Novodevichy Cemetery
Artists from Moscow
People's Artists of the USSR (visual arts)
Academic staff of Vkhutemas
Russian people of English descent
Academic staff of the Moscow School of Painting, Sculpture and Architecture